Jennifer Lee Juengel  is an animal health researcher in New Zealand. She has been a Fellow of the Royal Society Te Apārangi since 2016.

Early life and education 
Juengel grew up in Michigan, and attended Michigan State University. Juengel earned a PhD from the University of Missouri in 1992, with a thesis titled Mechanisms of luteal regression in cattle after which she completed a postdoctoral research post at Colorado State University.

Work 
Juengel works on the reproductive genetics of sheep. Juengel was appointed to AgResearch in 1998.

Juengel is Principal Scientist of AgResearch's Reproduction team at the Invermay campus.

Awards and honours 
Juengel was elected a Fellow of the Royal Society Te Apārangi in 2016.

Selected publications

References

External links 

Fellows of the Royal Society of New Zealand
New Zealand scientists
Living people
Year of birth missing (living people)
American emigrants to New Zealand
New Zealand women scientists
Michigan State University alumni
University of Missouri alumni